The fighting machine (also known as "Tripod") is one of the fictional machines used by the Martians in H.G. Wells' 1898 classic science fiction novel The War of the Worlds. In the novel, it is a fast-moving three-legged walker reported to be 100 feet tall with multiple whip-like tentacles used for grasping, and two lethal weapons: the Heat-Ray and a gun-like tube used for discharging canisters of a poisonous chemical black smoke that kills humans and animals. It is the primary machine the Martians use when they invade Earth, along with the handling machine the flying machine, and the embankment machine.

Description in the Novel

The fighting machines walk on three tall, articulated legs and have a grouping of long, whip-like metallic tentacles hanging beneath the central body, a single flexible appendage holding the heat-ray projector, and atop the main body a brazen hood-like head that houses a sole Martian operator. The fighting machines are armed with a heat-ray, which is fired by a camera-like device held by an articulated arm, and a chemical weapon known as "the black smoke", a poison gas which is deployed from gun tubes. The fighting machines can also discharge steam through nozzles that dissipates the black smoke, which then settles as an inert, powdery substance. The metallic tentacles, which hang below the main fighting machine body, are used as probes and to grasp objects. HMS Thunder Child, a Royal Navy torpedo ram, engages a trio of tripods that are pursuing a refugee flotilla heading to France from the southeast English coast; the Thunder Child is eventually destroyed by the Martian heat-ray, but not before taking out two fighting machines.

The original conceptual drawings for the fighting machines, drawn by Warwick Goble, accompanied the initial appearance of The War of the Worlds in Pearson's Magazine in 1897.

Adaptations

The War of the Worlds (1953 film)

The Martian fighting machines, designed by Albert Nozaki for George Pal's 1953 Paramount film The War of the Worlds, barely resemble the same machines in the H. G. Wells novel. The novel's fighting machines are 10-story tall tripods and carry the heat-ray projector on an articulated arm connected to the front of the machine's main body. They also possess the poison black smoke canisters fired from gun-like tubes, rather, than having the pulsing wingtip ray emitters used in the film that causes molecular disintegration to whatever it shoots. Also in the film, each Martian machine is armed with a visible, reddish heat-ray, atop a swiveling goose-neck, mounted in a cobra-like head. The film's war machines move about on three invisible legs of energy, which are only briefly visible when moving on the ground upon leaving their initial landing site.

Television series

The serialized War of the Worlds (1988–1990) television series was established as a sequel to the 1953 film with many of the alien technology in the first season cued with visual references to the design of those in the aforementioned film. An older model of the 1953 film's craft is shown to have physical legs more similar to the novel version.

War of the Worlds (2005 film)

There are several differences between the fighting machines as described in Wells' novel and those in Steven Spielberg's 2005 film, which come from an undisclosed alien world. In this version the tripods were long ago brought to Earth, having been buried underground sometime in its distant past. The aliens instead travel in capsules to their buried machines, which transport them underground. In a published interview screenwriter David Koepp stated his belief that they were planted by these extraterrestrials as a part of some kind of alien "contingency plan" (said plan never being revealed to the audience).

H.G. Wells' The War of the Worlds (2005 film) 

In Pendragon Pictures' direct-to-DVD H.G. Wells' The War of the Worlds the tripods have a large, free-moving head atop the smaller main body, giving its sole Martian occupant a panoramic view. It has three thick, metallic tentacles, which are held on high, made up of boxy-looking segments, making them appear like large bicycle chains rather than slim and whip-like, as described in Wells' novel; they are used mainly to capture humans during the film. The tripods have three long, ridged, and stilt-like legs, which occasionally stride with the right and rear leg moving forward together in a clumsy, unconvincing manner.

War of the Worlds 2: The Next Wave (2008 film)

In the Asylum's 2008 sequel War of the Worlds 2: The Next Wave, the walkers are tripods called squid-walkers, and are capable of flight. Unlike the first film, the Martians do not control the fighting machines directly from the inside but manipulate cyborgs by remote control. A heat-ray is attached to the walkers, as well as a kind of ray that teleports humans directly to the alien mothership, where humans are then drained of their blood to feed the invaders. Whereas Wells' fighting machines carried cages to hold captured humans, these tripods place humans directly into the tripods' interiors. These appear organic, with no windows or controls, and the walls absorb anyone unlucky enough to touch them, sending them to an unknown destination.

Jeff Wayne's Musical Version of The War of the Worlds

The fighting machines are described in Jeff Wayne's Musical Version of The War of the Worlds and depicted on the album artwork painted by Michael Trim. This version of the tripods does have major inconsistencies when compared to Wells' description in the novel. However, these tripods are popular with fans of the novel.

Parallel and sequel novels
In Kevin J. Anderson' The Martian War the Martians use two type of tripods, the ones from The War of the Worlds and a smaller, "overseer" variant. In Sherlock Holmes's War of the Worlds, the fighting machines are described as having legs that can telescope down allowing for entry and exit, and as being possibly based upon the original body type of the Martians.

Influence on later fiction
Creatures and machines similar to the fighting machines are featured in video games, such as the Annihilator Tripods from Command & Conquer 3, or the Striders from Half-Life

Coinage
In 2021 the Royal Mint announced a new version of the UK two pound coin in tribute to H.G. Wells. The coins bear an image of a Martian Fighting Machine with four instead of three legs, and The Invisible Man wearing the  
wrong style hat, resulting in derision from fans and collectors of Wells' work.

References

Notes

Bibliography

 Dalby, Richard. The Golden Age of Children's Book Illustration. New York: Gallery Books, 1991, .
 Edge, Laura Bufano. Steven Spielberg: Director of Blockbuster Films. New York: Publishers, Inc., 2008. .
 Hagerty, Jack and Jon Rogers. The Saucer Fleet. Burlington, Ontario, Canada: Apogee Books, 2008. .
 Morris, Nigel. The Cinema of Steven Spielberg: Empire of Light. New York: Wallflower Press, Columbia University, 2007. .
 Rubin, Steve. "The War of the Worlds." Cinefantastique magazine, Volume 5, No. 4 1977.
 Vander Hook, Sue. Steven Spielberg: Groundbreaking Director. Edina, Minnesota: ABDO, 2009. .
 Warren, Bill. Keep Watching The Skies Vol I: 1950–1957. Jefferson, North Carolina: McFarland & Company, 1982. .

The War of the Worlds
Science fiction film characters
Literary villains
Fictional mecha
Extraterrestrial supervillains